Turkey Creek may refer to:

Communities
Turkey Creek, Australia, known as Warmun Community, Western Australia 
Turkey Creek, Arizona
Turkey Creek, Florida, a rural, unincorporated community in Hillsborough County, Florida
Turkey Creek, Indiana, an unincorporated community in Steuben County
Turkey Creek, Kentucky
Turkey Creek, Louisiana
Turkey Creek Community Historic District, a historic district in Harrison County, Mississippi

Creeks
Turkey Creek (Windsor, Ontario), a creek crossed by the E. C. Row Expressway

United States

Colorado
Turkey Creek (Colorado), a creek bridged by the Canton Bridge Company, NRHP-listed

Florida
Turkey Creek (Econlockhatchee River), Orlando, Florida, United States
Turkey Creek (Indian River), Malabar and Palm Bay, Florida, United States
Turkey Creek Sanctuary, a nature reserve in Palm Bay, Florida

Georgia
Turkey Creek (Indian Creek tributary), a stream in Georgia
Turkey Creek (Oconee River tributary), a stream in Georgia

Iowa
Turkey Creek (Johnson County, Iowa)

Kansas
Turkey Creek (Kansas), a tributary of the Kansas River

Mississippi
Turkey Creek (Mississippi), a stream in Mississippi

Missouri
Turkey Creek (Bonne Femme Creek), a stream in Missouri
Turkey Creek (Castor River), a stream in Missouri
Turkey Creek (Cuivre River), a stream in Missouri
Turkey Creek (Ditch Creek), a stream in Missouri
Turkey Creek (Elk Fork Salt River), a stream in Missouri
Turkey Creek (Lake Taneycomo), a stream in Missouri
Turkey Creek (Little Sac River), a stream in Missouri
Turkey Creek (Osage River), a stream in Missouri
Turkey Creek (Spring River), a stream in Kansas and Missouri

Nebraska
Turkey Creek (Niobrara River tributary), a stream in Holt County, Nebraska

New York
Turkey Creek (New York), a stream in New York

North Carolina
Turkey Creek (Roberson Creek tributary), a stream in Chatham County, North Carolina
Turkey Creek (Crabtree Creek tributary), a stream in Wake County, North Carolina

Ohio
Turkey Creek (Ohio River), a stream in Ohio

South Dakota
Turkey Creek (South Dakota), a stream in South Dakota

Tennessee
Turkey Creek (Hardin County, Tennessee)

Texas
Turkey Creek (Nueces River), a tributary of the Nueces River, in Texas
Turkey Creek (Village Creek Tributary), a stream in Tyler and Hardin Counties, Texas

Virginia
Turkey Creek (Stewarts Creek tributary), a stream in Carroll County, Virginia

Other uses
Turkey Creek, a nature preserve in Pinson, Alabama 
Turkey Creek School, a school in Stone County, Arkansas
Historic Turkey Creek High School, a high school in Plant City, Florida
Turkey Creek (Tennessee), a shopping complex in Knox County, Tennessee

See also
Turkey Creek Township (disambiguation)